Stitt in Orbit is an  album by saxophonist Sonny Stitt recorded in 1960 and 1962 and originally released on the Roost label.

Reception
The Allmusic site awarded the album 3 stars.

Track listing 
All compositions by Sonny Stitt
 "No Cal"- 2:37 
 "Six-O-Seven Blues" - 6:07
 "Beware Rocks Comin’ Down" - 6:52 
 "Corn Flakes" - 3:26 
 "Eye Ball" - 4:59 
 "Saginaw" - 5:15 
Recorded in New York City on August 8, 1960 (tracks 2 & 3) and between February and June 1962 (tracks 1 & 4-6)

Personnel 
Sonny Stitt - alto saxophone, tenor saxophone
Hank Jones (tracks 1 & 4-6), Jimmy Jones (tracks 2 & 3) - piano 
Aaron Bell (tracks 2 & 3), Tommy Potter (tracks 1 & 4-6) - bass 
Roy Haynes - drums

References 

1963 albums
Roost Records albums
Albums produced by Teddy Reig
Sonny Stitt albums